

United Kingdom
 Province of Canada – Lord Elgin, Governor General (1847–1854)
 Malta – Richard More O'Ferrall, Governor of Malta (1847–1851)
New South Wales – Lieutenant Colonel Charles FitzRoy, Governor of New South Wales (1846–1855)
 South Australia – Sir Henry Fox Young, Governor of South Australia (1848–1854)
 Western Australia – Captain Charles Fitzgerald, Governor of Western Australia (1848–1855)

Portugal

Angola – Adrião da Silveiro Pinto, Governor-General of Angola (1848–1851)

Colonial governors
Colonial governors
1849